The Loser is the second studio album by the American hardcore punk band Gospel, released on May 13, 2022.

Upon its release, The Loser received positive reviews.

Track listing

Personnel 
Personnel per liner notes.

Gospel

 Adam Edward Dooling – vocals/guitar
 Sean Edward Miller – bass guitar
 Vincent Walter Roseboom – drums
 Johnathan Andrew Pastir – keyboards/guitar

Production

 Kurt Ballou  – producer, recording
 Magnus Lindeberg  – mastering

References 

2022 albums
Post-hardcore albums by American artists
Gospel (hardcore punk band)